Carolina Eiras (born 3 March 1969) is an Argentine alpine skier. She competed at the 1988 Winter Olympics and the 1992 Winter Olympics.

References

1969 births
Living people
Argentine female alpine skiers
Olympic alpine skiers of Argentina
Alpine skiers at the 1988 Winter Olympics
Alpine skiers at the 1992 Winter Olympics
Place of birth missing (living people)